Köklüce is a village in the Gerger District, Adıyaman Province, Turkey. The village is populated by Kurds of the Dêrsimî tribe and had a population of 96 in 2021. 

The village also has an Armenian population.

References

Villages in Gerger District
Kurdish settlements in Adıyaman Province